Roby High School is a public high school located in the city of Roby, Texas, USA and classified as a 1A school by the UIL.  It is a part of the Roby Consolidated Independent School District, a consolidation of McCauley and Roby in 1990 that is located in central Fisher County.  In 2015, the school was rated "Met Standard" by the Texas Education Agency.

Athletics
The Roby Lions compete in these sports - 

Cross Country, Football, Basketball, Powerlifting, Golf, Tennis, Track, Baseball & Softball

State Titles
Girls Basketball 
Girls State Finalist 2008 (1A/D2)
Girls State Champions 2009 (1A/D2)
Girls State Finalist 2016

Band
Marching Band Sweepstakes Champions 
1980(1A)

References

External links
Roby ISD

Public high schools in Texas
Schools in Fisher County, Texas